Luber may refer to:

People
 Hans Luber, German diver
 Helga Luber, German canoeist
 Rolf Luber, German canoeist

Other
 Luber, Arkansas, United States
 "Luber", a song from Xiu Xiu's 2002 album Knife Play

Toponymic surnames